Oligocentria is a genus of moths in the family Notodontidae, the prominents.

Species include:
Oligocentria alpica (Benjamin, 1932)
Oligocentria coloradensis (H. Edwards, 1885)
Oligocentria delicata (Dyar, 1905)
Oligocentria laciniosa (H. Edwards, 1885)
Oligocentria lignicolor (Walker, 1855) – white-streaked prominent
Oligocentria pallida (Strecker, 1899)
Oligocentria paradisus (Benjamin, 1932)
Oligocentria perangulata (H. Edwards, 1882)
Oligocentria pinalensis (Benjamin, 1932)
Oligocentria semirufescens (Walker, 1865) – red-washed prominent
Oligocentria violascens (Herrich-Schäffer, [1855])

References

Notodontidae